Abdel Rahman Massad Saleh (born 12 August 1957) is a Sudanese long-distance runner. He competed in the men's 5000 metres at the 1988 Summer Olympics.

References

1957 births
Living people
Athletes (track and field) at the 1988 Summer Olympics
Sudanese male long-distance runners
Olympic athletes of Sudan
Place of birth missing (living people)